Prodoxus phylloryctus is a moth of the family Prodoxidae. It is found in south-western Colorado, United States. The habitat consists of open oak-pine forests.

The wingspan is 9–13 mm. The forewings are mostly dark brown with numerous white bands and patches. The hindwings are light to medium gray.

The larvae feed on Yucca baccata. They mine the leaves of their host plant. They either feed singly or communally in mines parallel with the leaf surface. Communal mines have the form of blotches on the leaf surface. Pupation occurs in a cocoon inside the larval gallery.

References

Moths described in 1988
Prodoxidae